Lasioideae is a subfamily of flowering plants in the family Araceae. It contains 10 genera: Anaphyllopsis, Anaphyllum, Cyrtosperma, Dracontioides, Dracontium, Lasia, Lasimorpha, Podolasia, Pycnospatha, and Urospatha.

References
 Bown, Demi (2000). Aroids: Plants of the Arum Family. Timber Press. .

 
Alismatales subfamilies